Historical source is an original source that contains important historical information. These sources are something that inform us about history at the most basic level, and are used as clues in order to study history.

Historical sources can include coins, artefacts, monuments, literary sources, documents, artifacts, archaeological sites, features, oral transmissions, stone inscriptions, paintings, recorded sounds, images and oral history. Even ancient relics and ruins, broadly speaking, are historical sources. The types of sources include primary sources, secondary sources and tertiary sources.

Types

Primary source 
 

The natural morphological characters, the orographic and hydrographic structures, human interventions, buildings, infrastructures, archaeological finds, are "material sources that illustrate the uses and settlement forms of the past. The literary descriptions, the artistic images, the cartographic testimonies, are verbal or iconic sources able to provide other information, dictated by the historical subject who produced them. The historiographic synthesis project should bring together the different categories of sources, in the effort of a multidisciplinary investigation".

Secondary source 

This type of source generally includes evaluations of primary sources.

Tertiary source 

This type of source is an index or textual consolidation of already published primary and secondary sources

See also 
 Historical document
 Archive

External links
 What are Historical Sources? - University of Cambridge Faculty of History

References

Historiography
History resources
Source
Sources